Apateta is a genus of moths belonging to the subfamily Tortricinae of the family Tortricidae.

Species
Apateta cryphia Turner, 1926

See also
List of Tortricidae genera

References

External links
Tortricid.net

Tortricinae
Monotypic moth genera
Tortricidae genera